Rodrigo Daniel Pacheco Carrillo (born 14 January 1983) is a Peruvian badminton player. Pacheco started playing badminton when he was 6 years old at the club Regatas Lima. He had made his debut at the Pan Am Junior Championships in 1996, and became the senior national team member in 2001. He was the bronze medalists at the Pan American Games, in the men's singles event in 2007, and also in the mixed doubles event in 2007 and 2011. In 2010, he won triple gold medals at the South American Games in the men's doubles, mixed doubles, and mixed team event. He competed for Peru at the 2012 Summer Olympics. Pacheco educated Sports management at the University College of Northern Denmark.

Achievements

Pan American Games 
Men's singles

Mixed doubles

Pan Am Championships 
Men's singles

Men's doubles

South American Games 
Men's doubles

Mixed doubles

BWF International Challenge/Series 
Men's singles

Men's doubles

Mixed doubles

  BWF International Challenge tournament
  BWF International Series tournament
  BWF Future Series tournament

References

External links 

 
 

1983 births
Living people
Sportspeople from Lima
Peruvian male badminton players
Badminton players at the 2012 Summer Olympics
Olympic badminton players of Peru
Badminton players at the 2003 Pan American Games
Badminton players at the 2007 Pan American Games
Badminton players at the 2011 Pan American Games
Pan American Games bronze medalists for Peru
Pan American Games medalists in badminton
Competitors at the 2010 South American Games
South American Games gold medalists for Peru
South American Games medalists in badminton
Medalists at the 2007 Pan American Games
Medalists at the 2011 Pan American Games
21st-century Peruvian people